Kenneth Lee Johnson (born September 14, 1966) is a former professional American football player who played at the position of safety.

Early years and education
Born in Thomaston, Georgia, he attended the Robert E. Lee Institute (GA) and Florida A&M.

Professional football
He entered the National Football League (NFL) in 1989 as an undrafted free agent, signing for the Minnesota Vikings. There he played under defensive backs coach Pete Carroll, appearing in one game during the 1989 season. He played four more games for the Vikings in 1990, but was cut after their week 4 game against the Tampa Bay Buccaneers before resigning to their practice squad. On November 7, 1990, he was signed by the New York Jets, where Carroll was now defensive coordinator, as cover for the injured Brian Washington. He played four more games for the Jets, but these proved to be his final games in the NFL.

References

1966 births
Living people
People from Thomaston, Georgia
Players of American football from Georgia (U.S. state)
American football safeties
Florida A&M Rattlers football players
Minnesota Vikings players
New York Jets players